Chusé Raúl Usón Serrano (Jusep Raül Uson in SLA orthography), born in 1966 in Zaragoza, is a publisher and a Spanish writer in the Aragonese language.

References 
 "Uson, Jusep Raül" profile at Xordica
 "Usón Serrano, Chusé Raúl", profile at Gran Enciclopedia Aragonesa

Living people
1966 births
Spanish male writers
Spanish publishers (people)
People from Zaragoza
Aragonese-language writers